Stefan Hussong (2 November 1962) is a German classical accordionist.

He has received numerous awards for his performances, including the Gaudeamus International Competition for Performers for contemporary music, and was named best instrumentalist of the year by ECHO Klassik.

Life 
In 1983, he won first prize in the Hugo Herrmann Competition.

His work as a soloist is shared with many orchestras, such as the Orchestre de la Suisse Romande, the Tokyo Symphony Orchestra, the Tokyo Harmonia Chamber Orchestra, the Klangforum Wien and the Ensemble Modern. He has joined musicians such as violinist Irvine Arditti and cellists Julius Berger and Miklós Perényi.

He is a teacher of accordion and chamber music at the Hochschule für Musik Würzburg.

Style and repertoire 
Hussong's repertoire ranges from Baroque music to contemporary music, where he collaborates with the composers Sofia Gubaidulina, Toshio Hosokawa, Adriana Hölszky and Klaus Huber.

Hussong points out that the accordion, which had been a little-used instrument in academic music, has become a fascinating instrument because of the technical possibilities it possesses. : .

Prizes 
 1983 - First prize at the international Hugo Hermann competition.
 1987 - First prize at the Gaudeamus International Competition for Performers.
 1999 - Best Instrumentalist of the Year ECHO Klassik.

Recordings 
 1987: Johann Sebastian Bach, Goldberg Variations ; Sweelinck, Fantasia.
 1989: Nouvelle musique pour accordéon : works by Sofia Goubaïdoulina, V. Heyn, Klaus Huber, J. Krebs.
 1992: John Cage.
 1993: Sofia Goubaïdoulina, Sieben Worte, In croce - Orchestre de chambre Diagonal, dir. Florian Rosensteiner (29 May 1992/10 June 1993), Wergo 286 263-2) .
 1993: Adriana Hölszky, Space, Miserere, Decorum, Nouns to Nouns I, Innere Welten, Sonett.
 1993: Uros Rojko - Ensemble Aventure & Stefan Hussong, Whose Song, Tati, Ottoki, Glass voices.
 1994: Johann Sebastian Bach, English Suite No 2, 3 and 5 (Denon)
 1995: Tango Fantasy (9-10 January 1995, Denon CO-78841) .
 1996: Portrait of Toshio Hosokawa, Melodia, Sen V, In die Tiefe der Zeit, Vertical Time-study I,III (1996, Col Legno 20016) .
 1996: Toshio Hosokawa, In die Tiefe der Zeit ; John Cage, Two⁴ - with Julius Berger, violoncello (29 April 1996, Wergo WER 6617-2) .
 1997: Stefan Hussong joue Jean-Sébastien Bach : Partitas No 2 and 4, trois chorals (24-26 December 1996, Denon CO-18031) .
 1997: In die Tiefe der Zeit.
 1997: Whose Song, Musique d'accordéon du XXth : Toshio Hosokawa (Sen V), Magnus Lindberg (Jeux d'anches), Uros Rojko (Whose song), John Cage (Souvenir), À. Hölszky (Miserere), Igor Stravinsky (Tango) (December 1992, Thorofon) .
 1997: Révolutionnaires Tangos by Astor Piazzolla.
 1997: Stefan Hussong joue Cage : Dream, In a landscape, Souvenir, Two³ … (19-20 August 1997), Denon CO-18069) .
 1999: Stefan Hussong joue Frescobaldi.
 1999: Uros Rojko Chamber Music.
 2000: T'W'ogether. Stefan Hussong et Mie Miki interpètent Bach, Piazzolla, Mozart, Jukka Tiensuu, Solar, Takemitsu.
 2002: Sonora Distancia.
 2002: Bach - 3 Sonates pour viole de gambe et clavier BWV 1027-1029
 2002 High Way for One. À. Hölszky (High way for one), L. Berio (Sequenza XIII), K. Harada, À. Nordheim (Dinosauros), S. Gubaidulina (De profundis), Hyunkyung Lim (Me-A-Ri) (2000, Bella Musica Edition) .
 2002: Anarchic Harmonies. Girolamo Frescobaldi (Canzoni per Basso), John Cage (Harmonies).
 2003: Karlheinz Stockhausen Tierkreis (July 2002, Wergo) .
 2004: Toshio Hosokawa | Gagaku - Deep silence (18-20 February 2003), Wergo) .
 2005: Wolke und mond - Jean-Sébastien Bach, Adriana Hölszky.
 2008: Phonométrie : Erik Satie, Mike Svoboda - Anne-May Krüger, voix, orgue de Barbarie, piano jouet, mélodica; Stefan Hussong, accordéon, piano jouet, mélodica ; Mike Svoboda, trombone, mélodica (January, March 2007, Wergo) 
 2012: David Eagle and Hope Lee, Secret of the seven stars - with David Eagle, computer ; New Music Concerts Ensemble ; Robert Aiken, flûte et dir. (8 February 2009, November 2010, 25 September 2011, 16 April 2012 Centrediscs) 
 2015: Cage, Two 3 (2013, 2CD Wergo) 
 2017: Midstream (4-8 April 2016, Wergo)

Further reading

References

External links 
 
 
 
 Information sur Hussong on archive.org
 Biographie de Stefan Hussong sur bach-cantatas.com

German accordionists
Classical accordionists
Echo (music award) winners
Recipients of the Gaudeamus International Interpreters Award
1962 births
Living people
People from Püttlingen